Molly Raynor (June 5, 1905 – 12 March 1976) was a New Zealand and Australian actress.

Raynor was born 5 June 1905 in Dunedin, New Zealand. She left New Zealand as a school girl to study music, elocution, and singing at the Sydney Conservatorium of Music.  She married John McIntosh Beattie (John Warwick) in 1929. She died in Sydney, Australia, on 12 March 1976.

Life

Educated in Dunedin, Raynor left to study music at the Sydney Conservatorium.
Shortly after arriving in Sydney she appeared as one of Mrs. Bennett-Whites "Cheer-Oh Girls", a concert party that raised funds for charitable causes relating to soldiers and veterans - where she appeared between 1921 and 1927, giving character sketches.

Filmography
 The Hayseeds (1933) Pansy Regan (credited as Molly Rayner)
 Woman to Woman (1947) as Sylvia's Friend
 Dinner at Eight (1951)
 Theatre Royal (1952)
 Mr. Beamish Goes South (1953)
 The Scarlet Web (1954) as Miss Riggs
 Child's Play (1954) as Mrs Cannon

References

External links
 

1905 births
1976 deaths
20th-century Australian actresses
Sydney Conservatorium of Music alumni
Entertainments National Service Association personnel
New Zealand emigrants to Australia